Shelly Krolitzky (born 8 July 1999) is an Israeli tennis player.

Krolitzky has a career-high WTA singles ranking of 1,098, achieved on 10 October 2016, and a career-high WTA doubles ranking of 751, achieved on 25 September 2017. Krolitzky has won one ITF doubles title.

Biography
She lives in Azur, Israel.

Krolitzky has represented Israel in the Fed Cup, where she has a W/L record of 0–4.

ITF Finals

Doubles (2–2)

References

External links 
 
 
 

1999 births
Living people
Israeli female tennis players
People from Tel Aviv District
21st-century Israeli women